Regensdorf is a municipality in the district of Dielsdorf District of the canton of Zürich, Switzerland. It is the biggest city in the region Furttal (ZH).

Katzensee is a lake that also includes the bath/lido Strandbad Katzensee on the border with the Affoltern quarter of the city of Zürich.

History
Regensdorf is first mentioned in 870  as Reganesdorf.  In 931 it was mentioned as Wat and in 1040 as Adalinchova, when probably the Alt-Regensberg Castle was built by the House of Regensberg.

Geography

Of this area, 43.5% is used for agricultural purposes, while 23.6% is forested. Of the rest of the land, 30.6% is settled (buildings or roads) and the remainder (2.3%) is non-productive (rivers, glaciers or mountains).

The municipality is located on both sides of the Furtbach (Furt stream).  It consists of the villages of Watt (which in turn includes the hamlets of Oberdorf, Altburg, Katzensee and Neu-Hard), Adlikon and Regensdorf (which includes the hamlets of Alt-Hard and Geissberg).

Demographics
, 31.4% of the population was made up of foreign nationals. Over the last 10 years the population has grown at a rate of 16.5%. Most of the population speaks German  (77.8%), with Italian being second most common ( 5.6%) and Albanian being third ( 3.9%).

In the 2007 election the most popular party was the SVP which received 48.2% of the vote.  The next three most popular parties were the SPS (16.5%), the FDP (9.5%) and the CVP (8.7%).

The age distribution of the population is children and teenagers (0–19 years old) make up 21.7% of the population, while adults (20–64 years old) make up 67.7% and seniors (over 64 years old) make up 10.6%.  In Regensdorf about 65.6% of the population (between age 25–64) have completed either non-mandatory upper secondary education or additional higher education (either university or a Fachhochschule).

Regensdorf has an unemployment rate of 3.39%.  , there were 97 people employed in the primary economic sector and about 30 businesses involved in this sector.  2418 people are employed in the secondary sector and there are 163 businesses in this sector.  6321 people are employed in the tertiary sector, with 626 businesses in this sector.

The historical population is given in the following table:

Transportation

Bus
Regensdorf is served by bus lines 451 (Regensdorf Zentrum to Adlikon), 452 (Regensdorf Zentrum to Regensdorf Moosächer), 453 (Regensdorf Watt to Adlikon), 454 (Regensdorf Allmend to Regensdorf Watt), 456 (Dielsdorf to Regensdorf Watt), 485 (Zürich Altstetten to Buchs) and 491 (Hüttikon to Zurich Zehntenhausplatz).

S-Bahn
Regensdorf-Watt railway station is a stop of the Zürich S-Bahn, on the lines S6, S21 and SN6.

S6

There is a train every thirty minutes, from 05:26 to 00:21, on the S6 line. Inbound, the train stops at: Zürich Affoltern, Zürich Seebach, Zürich Oerlikon, Zürich Hardbrücke, Zürich Hauptbahnhof, Zürich Stadelhofen, Zürich Tiefenbrunnen, Zollikon, Küsnacht Goldbach, Küsnacht ZH, Erlenbach ZH, Winkel am Zürichsee, Herrliberg-Feldmeilen, Meilen, Uetikon (terminus).

Between Zürich Oerlikon and Herrliberg-Feldmeilen, the S6 combines with the S16 to provide a frequency of one train every fifteen minutes.

Outbound, the stops are: Buchs-Dällikon, Otelfingen Golfpark, Otelfingen, Würenlos, Wettingen, Baden (terminus).

S21

There is a train every thirty minutes, from 6:31 to 8:01, on the S21 line. It utilises the new DML tunnel.

The service operates on weekdays during peak hours; there are a total of eight trains in each direction per day. (Inbound trains in the morning and outbound trains in the evening bypass .)

The stops to and from Regensdorf:

Inbound: ,,  (terminus).

SN6
There is also the SN6, a night train that runs a single service between Zürich Tiefenbrunnen and Regensdorf-Watt, where it terminates. It leaves Tiefenbrunnen at 00:56 and arrives, seven stops later, at Regensdorf-Watt at 01:21.

The route of the SN6 to Regensdorf-Watt: Zürich Tiefenbrunnen, Zürich Stadelhofen, track 1, Zürich Hauptbahnhof, Zürich Hardbrücke, Zürich Oerlikon, Zürich Seebach, Zürich Affoltern.

Future service
In September 2014, an additional Zürich S-Bahn connection, from Regensdorf to Zürich Hauptbahnhof via the ETH Hönggerberg "Science City" underground station, was published.

Trolleybus

Sport
FC Regensdorf, an amateur football club, play at the Sportanlage Wisacher on Wiesackerstrasse. As of the 2019–20 season, they are in 2. Liga, the sixth tier of football in Switzerland.

Notable people 
 John Gossweiler (1873–1952), state botanist to the Government of Angola from 1899 to 1952
 Heinz Stettler (1952–2006), bobsledder, bronze medallist at the 1984 Winter Olympics

References

External links 

  
 

 
Cities in Switzerland
Municipalities of the canton of Zürich